Nic Stirzaker (born 8 March 1991) is an Australian rugby union footballer. His regular playing position is scrum-half and he currently plays for the Montauban in the Pro D2. Prior to that he represented the Rebels in Super Rugby and Melbourne Rising in the National Rugby Championship and Bristol Bears in Premiership Rugby.

Early life
Stirzaker was born in England to South African parents, but was raised in Australia from the age of two. He is one of three brothers and developed his love of Rugby at Knox Grammar School in Sydney.

Club career
Playing rugby at both Knox Grammar School and Sydney University, Stirzaker was signed to be a part of the Rebels extended playing squad during the 2012 season only playing a total of three games all coming off the bench. After his debut season as an extended player, Stirzaker played eleven games for the Rebels throughout 2013, starting twice and coming off the bench on nine occasions. On 25 June 2013, Stirzaker come off the bench in the 55th minute to play for the Rebels against the British & Irish Lions during their 2013 tour in a 0–35 defeat at AAMI Park, Melbourne.

In March 2014, Stirzaker re-signed with the Rebels until the succession of the 2015 season. Stirzaker was subsequently released to Palmerston North-based ITM Cup team Manawatu Rugby Club for the 2013 season. Finishing the season fifth in the Championship division, Stirzaker scored a total of three tries before returning to the Rebels in 2014.

Sustaining an injury before the 2014 season, Stirzaker only played eight of the sixteen games, starting in just four. After a fairly successful 2015 season for Stirzaker – playing fifteen games, scoring three tries, and helped lead the Rebels to a tenth position – he was among rumours of a possible call up to the Wallabies squad. Stirzaker is eligible to represent three countries internationally. Australia, England, and South Africa.

In early 2016, Stirzaker was announced as captain of the Rebels ahead of the season. He had undergone off-season shoulder surgery causing him to miss the season-opening match of the 2016 season against the Force in Perth. He played a total of eleven games scoring two tries.

In January 2018, Stirzaker signed a short, three-month term contract for Saracens in the Aviva Premiership for the 2017–18 season.

In late January 2018 Bristol Rugby announced that Stirzaker would join them for the upcoming 2018-19 Premiership Rugby season.

After leaving Bristol, Stirzaker moves to France to join Pro D2 outfit Montauban for the 2020-21 season.

International career
Stirzaker was selected and played for Australia XV that played the French Barbarians in late 2016 losing 19–11 in Bordeaux.

Super Rugby statistics

References

External links
Rebels profile

1991 births
Living people
Australian rugby union players
Rugby union scrum-halves
Rugby union players from London
English emigrants to Australia
Australian people of South African descent
Melbourne Rebels players
Melbourne Rising players
Manawatu rugby union players
Australian expatriate rugby union players
Expatriate rugby union players in New Zealand
Bristol Bears players
US Montauban players